Veijola is a Finnish surname.

Geographical distribution
As of 2014, 98.1% of all known bearers of the surname Veijola were residents of Finland (frequency 1:10,450).

In Finland, the frequency of the surname was higher than national average (1:10,450) in the following regions:
 1. North Ostrobothnia (1:1,627)
 2. Lapland (1:5,975)
 3. Kainuu (1:6,517)
 4. Central Ostrobothnia (1:9,553)

People
 Karl Gustaf Veijola (1864–1936), Finnish farmer and politician

References

Finnish-language surnames
Surnames of Finnish origin